Eberhardt Julius Georg Waldemar Bohnstedt, also sometimes spelt Eberhard, (22 July 1886 – 3 October 1957) was a German general and commander of the 7th Infantry Division in 1939. He is most well known for being the director of the Military School in El Salvador from 1938 to 1939. He retired from military life in 1939. He was the older brother of Wilhelm Bohnstedt.

Early life 

Eberhardt Bohnstedt was born in Kassel, German Empire, on 22 July 1886. In 1905, he joined the German Army as a Lieutenant as a part of the 12th Grenadier Regiment.

World War I 

Bohnstedt attended the War Academy from 1912 to 1914, and after which, he served in World War I as a Hauptmann in the General Staff of the 242nd Infantry Division. He participated in the German spring offensive and the Hundred Days Offensive.

Interwar period 

Bohnstedt was allowed to continue service in the Reichswehr following the war and served in the General Staff of the 3rd Division until 1923, when he was transferred to the 2nd Cavalry Division until 1924, the 12th Infantry Regiment until 1925, and then returned to the 3rd Division until 1929. In 1930, he transferred to the 6th Infantry Regiment and then to the 7th Infantry Regiment in 1932. He was promoted to Generalmajor in 1935, but retired shortly after his promotion.

On 24 April 1938, Bohnstedt came out of retirement and was appointed to be the director of the Military School in El Salvador by President Maximiliano Hernández Martínez. In El Salvador, he was promoted to the rank of General. He helped contribute to the fascist sympathies being held by the Salvadoran Army at the time, despite him being selected for his military expertise and not his political positions. He resigned his position in early September 1939 due to pressure from the United States on El Salvador to remove Germans and Italians from high ranking positions in their military.

World War II 

He returned to Germany and took command of the 7th Infantry Division from 30 September to 1 December 1939, after which he again retired from military life.

Personal life 

Bohnstedt married a woman named Kate. He had a brother, Wilhelm, who commanded the 32nd Infantry Division during World War II and who was a fellow recipient of the Knight's Cross of the Iron Cross.

Death 

Bohnstedt died in Wiesbaden, West Germany, on 3 October 1957, at the age of 71. He is buried in the South Cemetery of Wiesbaden.

Military ranks 

Leutnant – 18 August 1905
Fahnenjucker – 1 April 1909
Oberleutnant – 18 February 1913
Hauptmann – 12 December 1914
Major – 1 February 1925
Oberstleutnant – 1 February 1930
Oberst – 1 October 1932
Generalmajor – 1 July 1935
General – 24 April 1938

Commands held 

12th Grenadier Regiment
242nd Infantry Division
3rd Division
2nd Cavalry Division
12th Infantry Regiment
3rd Division
6th Infantry Regiment
7th Infantry Regiment
Military School of El Salvador
7th Infantry Division

Awards and decorations 

 Nazi Germany
 House of Hohenzollern
 Knight's Cross of the House Order of Hohenzollern
 Kingdom of Saxony
 Knight's Cross of the Albert Order
 Kingdom of Württemberg
 Knight's Cross of the Military Merit Order

References

Citations

Bibliography 

1886 births
1957 deaths
German Army  personnel of World War I
German Army officers of World War II
Reichswehr personnel
Salvadoran military personnel
Military personnel from Kassel